Andrea Kékesy, later Bernolák (born 17 September 1926) is a Hungarian former pair skater. She was born in Budapest. With her skating partner, Ede Király, she became the 1948 Olympic silver medalist, the 1949 World champion, and a two-time European champion (1948–1949).

Results

Pairs with Király

Ladies' singles

References

External links 
Skating in Hungary

Navigation

1926 births
Living people
Hungarian female pair skaters
Olympic figure skaters of Hungary
Olympic silver medalists for Hungary
Figure skaters at the 1948 Winter Olympics
Olympic medalists in figure skating
World Figure Skating Championships medalists
European Figure Skating Championships medalists
Medalists at the 1948 Winter Olympics
Figure skaters from Budapest
20th-century Hungarian women